Faisal al-Hamar is the former Minister of Health of Bahrain, from 2007 to 2011. He was sacked by Hamad ibn Isa Al Khalifa in response to the 2011 Bahraini protests.

Tenure
During his tenure as health minister, he oversaw the country's response to the Swine flu pandemic in 2009.

References

King Hamad drops four ministers 

Bahraini politicians
Government ministers of Bahrain
Living people
Year of birth missing (living people)